A Colonial Belle is an American silent film produced by Kalem Company and directed by Sidney Olcott with Gene Gauntier, Robert Vignola and George Melford in the leading roles. An episode of the revolutionary war.

Cast
 Gene Gauntier - 
 Robert Vignola - 
 James Vincent -
 George Melford -

External links

 A Colonial Belle website dedicated to Sidney Olcott

1910 films
Silent American drama films
American silent short films
Films directed by Sidney Olcott
1910 short films
1910 drama films
American black-and-white films
1910s American films